Jakkampudi Rammohan Rao (6 August 1953 – 9 October 2011) was a three-term member of the Legislative Assembly of Andhra Pradesh for Kadiyam constituency, winning elections in 1989, 1999 and 2004 as an Indian National Congress candidate. He was appointed State Minister of Roads and Buildings in 2004 and became Minister of Excise.

He was born in Adurru on 6 August 1953 and died at Bollineni Hospital on 9 October 2011, having suffered from diabetic neuropathy for several years. He had joined the YSR Congress in 2010.

He was married to Vijayalakshmi, who attempted election in 2009 due to his poor health, and the couple had 2 sons 
and daughter.

References

2011 deaths
Year of birth uncertain
1953 births
Andhra Pradesh MLAs 1989–1994
Andhra Pradesh MLAs 1999–2004
Andhra Pradesh MLAs 2004–2009
Indian National Congress politicians from Andhra Pradesh
YSR Congress Party politicians
Telugu politicians
State cabinet ministers of Andhra Pradesh
Neurological disease deaths in India
People from East Godavari district